The 2023 World Para Athletics Championships is an upcoming Paralympic track and field meet organized by the World Para Athletics subcommittee of the International Paralympic Committee.

It will be the 10th edition of the event and it is scheduled to be held in the Charlety Stadium in Paris, France, from 8 to 17 July 2023.

Paris was announced as the host city in December 2021. This will be the third time France hosts the World Championships; the first two editions were in Lille (2002) and Lyon (2013).

Participation

 (1)

References 

World Para Athletics Championships
2023 in disability sport
2023 in French sport
Athletics competitions in France
Sports competitions in Paris
2023 in athletics (track and field)